César del Rio (born 12 August 1941) is a Mexican wrestler. He competed in two events at the 1964 Summer Olympics.

References

1941 births
Living people
Mexican male sport wrestlers
Olympic wrestlers of Mexico
Wrestlers at the 1964 Summer Olympics
Place of birth missing (living people)